Clayton Ivan Friend (born 1964) is a New Zealand former professional rugby league footballer who played in the 1980s and 1990s.

Playing career
A Manukau junior and Auckland representative, Friend played for Carlisle in 1982 and then enjoyed a long spell with North Sydney. Cut by the Bears in 1990, he joined the Ryde-Eastwood team and, along with Olsen Filipaina, helped lead them to a Grand Final win in the Metropolitan Cup. At the end of the season he moved to England and returned to Carlisle. After a stint at Whitehaven between 1992 and 1995, Friend returned home and played for the Counties Manukau Heroes in the Lion Red Cup.

International career
Friend toured with the 1982 and 1985  Kiwis and toured the United Kingdom in 1983 with the New Zealand Māori side.

References

External links
 Friend makes British debut

1962 births
Living people
Auckland rugby league team players
Carlisle RLFC players
Counties Manukau rugby league team players
Manukau Magpies players
New Zealand Māori rugby league players
New Zealand Māori rugby league team players
New Zealand national rugby league team players
New Zealand rugby league players
North Sydney Bears players
People educated at Onehunga High School
Rugby league halfbacks
Rugby league players from Auckland
Whitehaven R.L.F.C. players